Barbara Douglas Cox  (born 10 May 1947) is a former association football player who represented New Zealand.

Cox captained the New Zealand women's team in their first ever international as they beat Hong Kong 2–0 on 25 August 1975 at the inaugural AFC Women's Asian Cup. She finished her international career with 34 caps to her credit.

In the 1996 New Year Honours, Cox was appointed a Member of the Order of the British Empire, for services to soccer.

Cox has a 1998 Master's degree from the University of Auckland titled Multiple bodies : sportswomen, soccer and sexuality and a PhD completed in 2010 titled Issues of power in a history of women's football in New Zealand: A Foucauldian genealogy, under the supervision of Toni Bruce.

In 2013, Cox became a founding committee member of the independent group Friends of Football

Cox's daughters Michele Cox and Tara Cox also represented New Zealand.

Honours

New Zealand
AFC Women's Championship: 1975

References

1947 births
Living people
New Zealand women's international footballers
New Zealand women's association footballers
New Zealand Members of the Order of the British Empire
Women's association football defenders